Dramatic Interpretation (often shortened to "Dramatic Interp," "Drama" or just "DI") is an event in National Speech and Debate Association (and NSDA-related) high school forensics competitions. In the National Christian Forensics and Communications Association the event is combined with Humorous Interpretation to create the Dramatic Performance event.  It consists of a piece from any published work, edited to fit within a 10-minute span with a 30-second grace period (it does not have a minimum and cannot be above 10:30).

In a typical round of DI, five to seven performers will each perform a "cutting" (excerpt) from a readily available, published (copyrighted or non-copyrighted) play, novel, or short story. As the name suggests, the cuttings are invariably from non-comedic (e.g., dramatic) works. Some performers select monologues, others may adopt the roles of many different characters, changing their tone, manner, and the position of their body to indicate a change in character.

After all of the competitors have performed, the judge (or judges) in the round will rank them from best to worst, and assign each of them a score.  Contestants who score well will "break" out of preliminary rounds and continue to advance through octo/quarter/semi/final rounds if they continue to score well.

NSDA Nationals 

National Speech and Debate Association Nationals was hosted in Salt Lake City, Utah in 2016. National Champions are awarded a scholarship of US$1,000. To receive the title a competitor must have the lowest cumulative score throughout the duration of the tournament. The Dramatic Interpretation competitor to receive the lowest cumulative score in the final round is awarded the BAMA Bowl and a US$500 scholarship. The National Speech and Debate Association (NSDA) National Tournament is the largest academic competition in the world.

Recent National Champions

Rules 

Dramatic Interpretation falls under the jurisdiction of events under the category defined as “Interpretation” by the National Speech and Debate Association (NSDA). These events are Humorous Interpretation, Duo Interpretation, and Program Oral Interpretation. Events that do not fall under the jurisdiction of the following rules include, but are not limited to Poetry, Prose, and Storytelling. The National Speech and Debate Associations rules are organized into categories of length, material, material availability, performance, re-use, and website approval submission process.

Length 
The set time limit is ten minutes with a thirty-second period in which a student may go overtime with no penalty, colloquially referred to as a 'grace period.'According to National Speech and Debate Association rules, a student who exceeds the ten minute and thirty-second time limit cannot be awarded the rank of 1st in the round. There is no minimum time limit.

Material and material availability 
A student may choose from a single work of literature to perform. 
Acceptable forms of literature include:
 Novels
 Plays
 Anthologies where only one piece of literature is performed
 Poetry
 Song lyrics

Performance 
In Dramatic Interpretation, Duo Interpretation, and Humorous Interpretation performers are not permitted to use any type of "physical objects or costuming." 
In addition, students may not: 
 Adapt material for purposes other than transitional. Controversially, sub-point 5. An under Interpretations on the National Speech and Debate Association Manual has been used to disqualify national finalist and national champions during and after the final round at National Speech and Debate Association Nationals. (See Humorous Interpretation (Contestant H208))
 Rely on the use of scripts.

Re-use 
Students may not perform the same work of literature at any National Speech and Debate Association tournament if they have already done so in a separate contestant year.

Website approval submission process 
All piece selection is subject to online year-round review.

College Dramatic Interpretation 
In college, DI cuttings must be from a play. Novels and short stories are used in prose. College competitors in the event are discouraged from singing and are allowed to select exclusively from published plays. Creating a Dramatic Interpretation from multiple plays is allowed if the aggregate product is of one cohesive theme.

See also 
 Duo Interpretation
 Humorous Interpretation
 National Christian Forensics and Communications Association
 National Forensic League
 National Speech and Debate Association

References

External links 
 Dramatic & Humorous Interpretation, Dramatic Performance

Debating
Public speaking